Norberto Mourão (born 29 October 1980) is a Portuguese paracanoeist. He represented Portugal at the 2020 Summer Paralympics.

Career
In May 2019, Mourão competed at the 2019 Paracanoe European Championships in the men's VL2 and won a bronze medal. In August 2019, he competed at the 2019 ICF Canoe Sprint World Championships in the men's VL2 event and won a silver medal.

Mourão represented Portugal at the 2020 Summer Paralympics in the men's VL2 event and won a bronze medal.

References

1980 births
Living people
People from Vila Real, Portugal
Portuguese male canoeists
Paracanoeists at the 2020 Summer Paralympics
Medalists at the 2020 Summer Paralympics
Paralympic medalists in paracanoe
Paralympic bronze medalists for Portugal
ICF Canoe Sprint World Championships medalists in paracanoe
Sportspeople from Vila Real District
20th-century Portuguese people
21st-century Portuguese people